Braedyn Crowley (born 10 October 1996) is an Australian professional soccer player who plays as a striker for Maitland FC in the National Premier Leagues Northern NSW.

Career
In 2014, Braedyn Crowley was ranked 7th on the list of leading goalscorers for the 2014 NPL competition, with the six players above him all playing in top five teams. Braedyn scored 17 goals for his previous club in 23 games – almost half of the total goals scored by the team for the season (38). Braedyns success on the field earned him the title after the 2014 season ended as Coach's Player of the Year by Northern Fury FC's director of coaching, Ian Ferguson, and Young Player of the Year by NPL Queensland.

Northcote City
In April 2016, Crowley joined Melbourne based National Premier Leagues Victoria side Northcote City FC. He picked the number 10 kit. Crowley made his Northcote debut on 15 April 2016, in a 3–0 Round 8 loss to Port Melbourne SC. Crowley got off the mark for City in Round 10, scoring his side's second goal in a 3–2 win over Richmond SC. The striker grabbed his third Northcote goal in Round 13 in a 3–2 loss to Oakleigh Cannons FC at John Cain Memorial Reserve. Crowley then stunned the NPL Victoria by scoring all five of Northcote's goals in their 5–0 win over Melbourne Knights FC in Round 16. Crowley scored a hattrick against Port Melbourne in Round 21 3–1 win, to take his tally to 10 goals in 13 games. Crowley finished the season with 13 goals in 19 games.

Melbourne City
Upon the conclusion of Northcote's NPL Victoria season, Crowley joined Melbourne City on trial. He was announced as a Melbourne City player on 6 September 2016, signing a two-year scholarship contract. Crowley was elevated to the first-team squad ahead of the 2017–18 season.

On 13 February 2018, Crowley and Melbourne City mutually terminated his contract, after four appearances for the club since joining in 2016.

On 13 February 2018, Crowley was confirmed to have signed with FC Bulleen.

Lambton Jaffas 
Crowley played his first league game for Lambton Jaffas against his former side, the Newcastle Jets Youth Side, a game in which he scored. He ended his first season at Lambton with 16 games and 9 goals. The next season, he improved his numbers significantly to 19 games and 15 goals, which included a hattrick against Valentine FC.

Maitland FC 
Crowley switched from Lambton Jaffas to fellow National Premier Leagues Northern NSW side Maitland FC. Crowley scored 17 goals in 17 games for Maitland, which included a hattrick against Adamstown Rosebud FC. Crowley left at the end of the season to join National Premier Leagues Victoria side Bentleigh Greens.

Bentleigh Greens 
Crowley scored 8 goals in 18 games for Bentleigh Greens as they finished 3rd in the suspended National Premier Leagues Victoria season.

Return to Maitland FC 
Braedyn returned to Maitland for the 2022 National Premier Leagues Northern NSW season. In the third game of the season, Crowley scored 5 goals against Adamstown Rosebud FC. Later on in the season, he scored a hattrick against Newcastle Olympic FC. Braedyn added another hattrick against Adamstown, his third for the season. Two weeks later, he added his fourth hattrick of the season, this time, against Lake Macquarie City FC. Braedyn ended up finishing the season with 22 games and 28 goals in the league, as well as winning the leagues golden boot and making the team of the year. Furthermore, Maitland won the Minor Premiership and came runners up in the Grand Final. Across all comps for Maitland in 2022, Braedyn finished with 33 goals in 25 games, his most prolific season to date.

Career statistics

References

Living people
1996 births
Australian soccer players
Association football forwards
Northern Fury FC players
Melbourne City FC players
Newcastle Jets FC players
A-League Men players
Bentleigh Greens SC players